Zeiss planetarium may refer to:

 Zeiss Major Planetarium (German ), Berlin, Germany, built 1987
 Zeiss-Planetarium Jena, a planetarium in Jena, Germany, built 1926